Veľký Grob is a village and municipality in Galanta District of  the Trnava Region of south-west Slovakia.

Names and etymology
In historical records the village was first mentioned in 1335 (Grwb). The name derives from German Graben ("ditch"). An extended historic name Nemecký ("German") Grob dates back to the 16th century. It distinguished the village from Chorvátsky ("Croatian") Grob and Slovenský ("Slovak") Grob.

Geography
The municipality lies at an elevation of 130 metres and covers an area of 23.545 km². It has a population of about 1290 people.

References

External links
 Official page
 https://web.archive.org/web/20070513023228/http://www.statistics.sk/mosmis/eng/run.html

Villages and municipalities in Galanta District